Centre for Human Rights, Education, Advice and Assistance (CHREAA) is a non-profit organization in Malawi that assists marginalized people with human rights issues and legal advice. It facilitates access to justice for the poor. Part of their advocacy work in reforming the criminal justice system, particularly in the prisons in Malawi.

References

Human rights organisations based in Malawi
Organizations with year of establishment missing